In the field of engineering, a chemical engineer is a professional, equipped with the knowledge of chemical engineering, who works principally in the chemical industry to convert basic raw materials into a variety of  products and deals with the design and operation of plants and equipment.<ref>MobyDick Dictionary of Engineering", McGraw-Hill, 2nd Ed.</ref> In general, a chemical engineer is one who applies and uses principles of chemical engineering in any of its various practical applications; these often include

 Design, manufacture, and operation of plants and machinery in industrial chemical and related processes ("chemical process engineers")
 Development of new or adapted substances for products ranging from foods and beverages to cosmetics to cleaners to pharmaceutical ingredients, among many other products ("chemical product engineers")
 Development of new technologies such as fuel cells, hydrogen power and nanotechnology, as well as working in fields wholly or partially derived from chemical engineering such as materials science, polymer engineering, and biomedical engineering. This can include working of geophysical projects such as rivers, stones, and signs 

History

The president of the Institution of Chemical Engineers said in his presidential address "I believe most of us would be willing to regard Edward Charles Howard (1774–1816) as the first chemical engineer of any eminence".  Others have suggested Johann Rudolf Glauber (1604–1670) for his development of processes for the manufacture of the major industrial acids.

The term appeared in print in 1839, though from the context it suggests a person with mechanical engineering knowledge working in the chemical industry. 
In 1880, George E. Davis wrote in a letter to Chemical News "A Chemical Engineer is a person who possesses chemical and mechanical knowledge, and who applies that knowledge to the utilisation, on a manufacturing scale, of chemical action."  He proposed the name Society of Chemical Engineers, for what was in fact constituted as the Society of Chemical Industry. At the first General Meeting of the Society in 1882, some 15 of the 300 members described themselves as chemical engineers, but the Society's formation of a Chemical Engineering Group in 1918 attracted about 400 members.

In 1905 a publication called The Chemical Engineer was founded in the US, and in 1908 the American Institute of Chemical Engineers was established.

In 1924 the Institution of Chemical Engineers adopted the following definition: "A chemical engineer is a professional man experienced in the design, construction and operation of plant and works in which matter undergoes a change of state and composition."

As can be seen from the later definition, the occupation is not limited to the chemical industry, but more generally the process industries, or other situations in which complex physical and/or chemical processes are to be managed.

The UK journal The Chemical Engineer'' (began 1956) has a series of biographies available online entitled “Chemical Engineers who Changed the World”,

Overview 

Historically, the chemical engineer has been primarily concerned with process engineering, which can generally be divided into two complementary areas: chemical reaction engineering and separation processes. The modern discipline of chemical engineering, however, encompasses much more than just process engineering.  Chemical engineers are now engaged in the development and production of a diverse range of products, as well as in commodity and specialty chemicals. These products include high-performance materials needed for aerospace, automotive, biomedical, electronic, environmental and military applications. Examples include ultra-strong fibers, fabrics, adhesives and composites for vehicles, bio-compatible materials for implants and prosthetics, gels for medical applications, pharmaceuticals, and films with special dielectric, optical or spectroscopic properties for opto-electronic devices. Additionally, chemical engineering is often intertwined with biology and biomedical engineering.  Many chemical engineers work on biological projects such as understanding biopolymers (proteins) and mapping the human genome.

Employment's and salaries
According to a 2015 salary survey by the American Institute of Chemical Engineers, the median annual salary for a chemical engineer was approximately $127,000. The survey was repeated in 2017 and the median annual salary dropped slightly to $124,000. The decrease in median salary was unexpected. A factor contributing to the decline may be that 2017’s survey was conducted by a different research and analysis firm. Median salaries ranged from $70,450 for chemical engineers with fewer than three years of experience to $156,000 for those with more than 40 years in the workforce.

In the UK, the IChemE 2016 Salary Survey reported a median salary of approximately £57,000, with a starting salary for a graduate averaging £28,350.  Chemical engineering in the USA is one of the engineering disciplines with the highest participation of women, with 35% of students compared with 20% in engineering.   In the UK in 2014, students starting degrees were 25% female, compared with 15% in engineering. US graduates who responded to a 2015 salary survey were 18.8% female.

See also

American Institute of Chemical Engineers
Distillation
Fluid dynamics
Heat transfer
History of chemical engineering
Institution of Chemical Engineers (IChemE)
List of chemical engineering societies
List of chemical engineers
Mass transfer
Process control
Process design (chemical engineering)
Process engineering
Process miniaturization
Unit operations
Chemfluence

References

External links
American Institute of Chemical Engineers (USA)
Institution of Chemical Engineers (UK)
Canadian Society for Chemical Engineers
Engineers Australia (AUS)

Engineering occupations